is a Japanese manga series written and illustrated by Nobuyuki Anzai. It was serialized in Shogakukan's Weekly Shōnen Sunday from April 1995 to February 2002, with its chapters collected in 33 tankōbon volumes.

The series was adapted into a 42-episode anime television series by Pierrot, broadcast on Fuji TV from July 1997 to July 1998. The series has also spawned two video games and other merchandise. Both the anime and manga were licensed for North American distribution in English by Viz Media. The anime has since been picked up by Discotek Media who re-released the series on DVD in 2015.

As of June 2013, Flame of Recca had over 25 million copies in circulation, making it one of the best-selling manga series.

Plot

Flame of Recca follows the story of a teenage boy named Recca Hanabishi, who is interested in ninja and claims to be one himself. He often gets into fights because he made it publicly known that the person who manages to defeat him will earn his services as a loyal ninja. Despite this, he eventually pledges his loyalty and services as a ninja to Yanagi Sakoshita, a girl with the innate ability to heal any wound/injury, because of her kindness and compassion. Recca soon discovers that he possesses the innate ability to control/manipulate flames, and eventually learns that he is actually the son of the sixth generation leader of the Hokage, a ninja clan that was wiped out in 1576, roughly 400 years before the series' present day.

The Hokage ninjas wielded mystical objects called , which are referred to as "psychic devices" or "mystical weapons" in the English versions of the series. Madōgu grant their users special abilities, such as allowing their users to manipulate certain elements (as in the case of the Fūjin, which allows its wielder to manipulate the element of wind) and enhancing their user's strength/skills (as in the case of the Dosei no Wa, which increases its user's physical strength and the Idaten, which increases its user's running speed). Oda Nobunaga had invaded the Hokage in 1576 for the purpose of acquiring these weapons, and the series' main antagonist, Kōran Mori, is searching for a madōgu that will grant him eternal life. Recca and his friends become entangled in Mori's quest for eternal life as he attempts to kidnap Yanagi, believing that her healing powers will help him achieve immortality. This leads them to join the Ura Butō Satsujin, a tournament wherein the warriors that wield madōgu gather to battle each other.

Though it begins by following the same basic storyline, the Flame of Recca anime series ends right after the Ura Butō Satsujin ends, while the manga goes on to include the subplot involving the Tendō Jigoku. The anime also omits certain characters from the story, and several of the characters' physical appearances are slightly different from the manga.

Media

Manga

Flame of Recca, written and illustrated by Nobuyuki Anzai, was serialized in Shogakukan's shōnen manga magazine Weekly Shōnen Sunday from April 5, 1995 to February 13, 2002, with a total of 329 chapters. The series was compiled into 33 tankōbon volumes published by Shogakukan from September 18, 1995 to April 18, 2002. Shogakukan also released the manga in 17 wideban volumes from January 18, 2006 to March 16, 2007, and a bunkoban edition from July 15, 2010 to October 15, 2011.

The manga was licensed for North American distribution in English by Viz Media and United Kingdom distribution in English by Gollancz Manga. Viz released all 33 volumes from July 30, 2003 to November 10, 2009, while Gollancz released ten volumes between March 6 and November 28, 2006.

Anime

Flame of Recca was adapted into a 42-episode anime series produced by Studio Pierrot, and aired in Japan from July 19, 1997 to July 10, 1998 on Fuji Television. Flame of Recca was also aired on the satellite network Animax in Japan and Asia. Pony Canyon has released the entire series on DVD and laserdisc, while Geneon released it in two DVD boxsets on April 22 and June 24, 2005 in Japan. In North America, Viz Media released the series in ten separate DVD volumes between October 26, 2004 and January 9, 2007. Discotek Media re-licensed the series in 2014 and released it on DVD in February 2015.

There are several notable differences between the anime and manga, such as the character designs (e.g. Fūko has purple-violet hair in the anime, but has brown hair in the manga) and in the storyline itself (e.g. In the anime, Yanagi's healing powers are first revealed when she heals Recca after he gets injured while protecting her and a child from being crushed under metal pipes, but in the manga, Yanagi heals Recca when he gets injured while protecting her from a group of male students who were forcing her to go with them).

Soundtrack
The Flame of Recca anime series featured background music composed by Yusuke Honma. All the songs were released in singles, and all except "Zutto Kimi no Soba de" were included in the original soundtracks. Flame of Recca Original Soundtrack Vol. 1 was released by Pony Canyon on December 6, 1997, and features background music used in the series, as well as the series' opening song and first closing song. Flame of Recca Original Soundtrack Vol. 2 was released by Pony Canyon on May 4, 1998. It includes more background music used in the series along with a special CD drama entitled .

Video games
Flame of Recca has been adapted into two games to date.

 is a fighting game released by Konami on December 20, 2001 for the Game Boy Advance. In this game, the player selects a character and presses certain button in order to make them move, attack, dodge, and perform special moves. Apart from having an HP bar, the selected character a power bar which increases when the character deals damage and decreases when the character performs a special move. Each character has his/her own set of special moves that do greater damage than normal attacks, and one super move that deals a significant amount of damage. There are nine playable characters for this game.

 is an action/fighting game released by Konami on June 10, 2004 for the PlayStation 2. A limited number of soundtrack CDs and sets of four bookmarks with character illustrations by Nobuyuki Anzai were given out along with the game CD. The game's graphics and full motion videos are done in 2D animation. The game utilizes a split-screen format wherein players must press different button combinations to make their selected character perform specific moves. Certain cutscenes require the player to determine what the selected character will do next through choosing from a given set of options. An example of this would be when the player is required to choose if Koganei will dodge or stay put when the building he is staying in starts to collapse. Flame of Recca: Final Burning features 24 playable characters.

The series' protagonist has also appeareded in the 2009 Konami fighting game Sunday vs Magazine: Shūketsu! Chōjō Daikessen for the PlayStation Portable.

Reception
As of June 2013, Flame of Recca had over 25 million copies in circulation.

Jason Thompson, author of Manga: The Complete Guide, described the Flame of Recca manga as "polished and quick-paced", and that it "reads like a more carefully plotted, more extreme version of Yu Yu Hakusho." Patricia Duffield, a columnist for Animerica Extra, felt the story and artwork continuously evolved with characters and their unique weapons. "Although the series seems to have a tendency toward male fan service, Flame of Recca can be as enjoyable for gals as it is for guys." Duffield concluded, "If lots of ninja action with supernatural flair interests you, give Flame of Recca a try."

In 2010, Mania.com's Briana Lawrence listed Flame of Recca at number four of the website's "10 Anime Series That Need a Reboot".

References

External links
Flame of Recca at Shonen Sunday
Flame of Recca at Viz Media
Flame of Recca at Studio Pierrot 

1995 manga
1997 anime television series debuts
Adventure anime and manga
Cultural depictions of Oda Nobunaga
Discotek Media
Fuji TV original programming
Game Boy Advance games
Game Boy Advance-only games
Konami games
Martial arts anime and manga
Ninja in anime and manga
Pierrot (company)
Japan-exclusive video games
PlayStation 2 games
PlayStation 2-only games
Shogakukan franchises
Shogakukan manga
Shōnen manga
Supernatural anime and manga
Viz Media anime
Viz Media manga
Video games developed in Japan